New Zealand competed at the 2012 Summer Paralympics in London, United Kingdom, from 29 August to 9 September 2012. The country won 17 medals in total, including six gold medals, and finished twenty-first on the medals table.

Team 

New Zealand had 23 athletes, plus 1 cycling pilot, competing across 7 sports. It was the nation's smallest team since Barcelona in 1992, in part because it included no representatives in team events such as wheelchair rugby and boccia.

Michael Johnson, New Zealand's most successful Paralympic shooter, carried the flag at the opening ceremony. Sophie Pascoe, who won six swimming medals at the Games, carried the flag at the closing ceremony. Former Paralympic swimmer and gold medallist Duane Kale was the Chef de Mission. Paralympic cyclist Jayne Parsons withdrew from the team after failing her final pre-Games fitness test.

At age 13 years and 8 months, swimmer Nikita Howarth was the youngest member of the team as well as New Zealand's youngest ever Paralympian.

Medallists

| width="75%" align="left" valign="top" |

| width="25%" align="left" valign="top" |

Events

Athletics

Men—Track

Men—Field

Women—Field

Cycling

Road

Track

Team Sprint

Equestrian

Rowing

Sailing

Shooting

Michael Johnson was New Zealand's flag bearer for the opening ceremonies.

Swimming

Note: Qualifiers for the finals (Q) of all events were decided on a time only basis, therefore ranks shown are overall ranks versus competitors in all heats. Also, ranks shown for those who did not advance are their final ranks.

Men

Women

Key
Note–Ranks given for preliminary rounds are within the athlete's heat only, with the exception of swimming (see section)
Q = Qualified for the next round
q = Qualified for the next round as a fastest loser or by position without achieving the qualifying target
PR = Paralympic record
WR = World record
N/A = Round not applicable for the event
Bye = Athlete not required to compete in round

See also
New Zealand at the Paralympics
New Zealand at the 2012 Summer Olympics

Notes

Nations at the 2012 Summer Paralympics
2012
Paralympics